Oerstediidae is a family of worms belonging to the order Monostilifera.

Genera:
 Friedrichia Kirsteuer, 1965
 Oerstedia Quatrefages, 1846
 Typhloerstedia Chernyshev, 1999

References

Monostilifera
Nemertea families